"Deal" is a song written and recorded by American country music artist Tom T. Hall. It was released in May 1975 as the only single from the album, I Wrote a Song About It. The song peaked at number 8 on both the U.S. and the Canadian country singles chart.

Chart performance

References 
 

1975 singles
Tom T. Hall songs
Songs written by Tom T. Hall
Song recordings produced by Jerry Kennedy
1975 songs
Mercury Records singles